The following is a timeline of the history of the city of Łódź, Poland.

Prior to 19th century

 1332 - Łódź mentioned as the village Łodzia in a document of Duke Władysław the Hunchback of the Polish Piast dynasty
 1423 - Łódź granted city rights by Polish King Władysław II Jagiełło
 1487 - Polish King Casimir IV Jagiellon visited Łódź.
 1496 - Polish King John I Albert confirmed the establishment of two annual fairs and a weekly market in Łódź.
 1793
 City annexed by Prussia in the Second Partition of Poland and included within the newly formed province of South Prussia.
 Population: 190.

19th century

 1806 - Town joins the Napoleonic Duchy of Warsaw.
 1815 - Town becomes part of Russian client state Congress Poland per Congress of Vienna.
 1820 - Antoni Czarkowski becomes mayor.
 1824 - Lodka settlement developed.
 1827 - K.F. Wendisch factory in business.
 1828 - Slazaki settlement developed.
 1829 - Population: 4,273.
 1837 - Ludwig Geyer factory in business.
 1839 - White Factory built.
 1852 - Industrialist Karl Scheibler in business.
 1860 - Population: 31,500.
 1861 - Stara Synagogue built.
 1863
 31 January: A Polish insurgent unit entered the city without a fight in the first days of the January Uprising, and seized weapons and 18,000 rubles for the uprising.
 18 June: Clash between Polish insurgents and Russian troops.
 29 September: Clash between Polish insurgents and Russian troops.
 Lodzer Zeitung bilingual Polish-German newspaper begins publication.
 1866 - Koluszki-Łódź railway begins operating.
 1867
 Congress Poland forcibly integrated with of the Russian Empire.
 Sudden death of Shakespearean actor Ira Aldridge before his scheduled performance at a local theater.
 1868 - Łódź Fabryczna railway station built.
 1870 - Studio Theatre opened.
 1872 - Moscow-Łódź railway begins operating.
 1878 - Manufaktura textile mill built.
 1881
 Great Synagogue built.
 Population: 49,592.
 1884 - Alexander Nevsky Cathedral built.
 1888 - Karl Scheibler's Chapel built.
 1892 - Izrael Poznański factory built.
 1897 - Population: 314,780.
 1899
 First cinema in Poland (Gabinet Iluzji) founded by brothers Władysław and Antoni Krzemiński.
 Hazomir Choral Society founded.
 1900 - Population: 351,570.

20th century

1900s–1930s

 1901 - Krzemiński cinema active.
 1902 - Łódź Kaliska railway station built.
 1904 - Ezras Israel Synagogue built.
 1905 - 21–25 June: Łódź insurrection.
 1908 - ŁKS Łódź football club (later multi-section club) founded.
 1910 - Widzew Łódź football club formed.
 1914
 11 November: Battle of Łódź begins near city.
 December: Germans in power.
 1915 -  becomes part of city.
 1918 - Poland regains independence and the city becomes again part of Poland.
 1920 - Catholic Diocese of Łódź established.

 1922 - City becomes capital of Łódź Voivodeship (province).
 1925 - Łódź Airport opens.
 1928 - Osiedle Montwiłła-Mireckiego luxury neighborhood founded.
 1930
 Stadion Widzewa (stadium) opens.
 Municipal Museum of History and Art inaugurated.
 December: Monument of Polish national hero Tadeusz Kościuszko unveiled at the Plac Wolności ("Freedom Square") in the city center.
 1931
 January: Museum of Ethnography established.
 ŁKS Łódź wins its first Polish men's volleyball championship.
 1937 - HKS Łódź wins its first Polish women's volleyball championship.

World War II (1939–1945)

 1939
 2 September: Germany carried out first air raids, bombing the airport and the Łódź Kaliska train station.
 3 September: Further air raids carried out by Germany. The Germans bombed a railway station in the Widzew district, a power plant, a gas plant, a thread factory and many houses.
 5 September: The Germans air raided the airport again.
 6 September: The Germans air raided a historic palace which housed the command of the Polish Łódź Army.
 6 September: the Citizens' Committee of the City of Łódź established.
 6–8 September: Battle of Łódź during the German invasion of Poland, which started World War II.
 9 September: German troops entered the city, beginning of the German occupation.
 11 September: The Germans issued the first occupation decrees.
 12 September: The German Einsatzgruppe III entered the city to commit various crimes against the population.
 12–15 September: The Germans carried out searches of local county offices and Polish police buildings.
 16 September: Local administration took over by a German official, D. Leiste from Rhineland.
 21 September: The Germans carried out mass searches in the present-day district of Chojny.
 September: The Germans carried out first arrests of Poles as part of the Intelligenzaktion and established first prisons for arrested Poles.
 12 October – 4 November: City becomes seat of Nazi German General Government of occupied Poland.
 31 October: A German transit camp for Poles arrested in the Intelligenzaktion established in the present-day district of Ruda Pabianicka.
 November: Radogoszcz concentration camp established by the Germans. Its prisoners were mostly people from Łódź, Pabianice and other nearby settlements.
 9 November: City annexed directly into Nazi Germany; the Germans destroyed the monument of Polish national hero Tadeusz Kościuszko.
 9 November: First prisoners detained in the Radogoszcz concentration camp.
 November: Hundreds of Poles from Łódź and the region massacred by the Germans in the forest in the present-day district of Łagiewniki as part of the Intelligenzaktion.
 City renamed "Litzmannstadt" to erase traces of Polish origin.
 11 December: The Germans massacred 70 Polish prisoners of the Radogoszcz camp in Łagiewniki.
 13 December: The Germans massacred 40 Polish prisoners of the Radogoszcz camp in Łagiewniki.
 December: 65 prisoners from the transit camp in Pabianice deported to the Radogoszcz concentration camp and then massacred in Łagiewniki.
 31 December: First expulsions of Poles from Osiedle Montwiłła-Mireckiego carried out.
 Hundreds of Poles from Łódź massacred by the Germans in the nearby village of Lućmierz-Las.

 1940
 14–15 January: German police and Selbstschutz carried out mass expulsions of Poles from Osiedle Montwiłła-Mireckiego.
 February: More prisoners from the liquidated transit camp in Pabianice imprisoned in the Radogoszcz camp; Radogoszcz camp converted into the Radogoszcz prison.
 February: Łódź Ghetto formed.
 Hundreds of Poles from Łódź massacred by the Germans in the nearby village of Lućmierz-Las.
 March: 11 Polish boy scouts from Łódź massacred by the Germans in the Okręglik forest near Zgierz.
 April–May: The Russians committed the large Katyn massacre, among the victims of which were over 1,200 Poles, who either were born or lived in Łódź or the region before the war.
 1941
 February: German prisoner-of-war camp Stalag Luft II established in the present-day district of Ruda Pabianicka.
 November: 5,007 Romani people deported by the Germans from German-occupied Burgenland to Łódź and imprisoned in a new German camp.

 1942
 January: The Germans dissolved the camp for Romani people and exterminated its prisoners in the Chełmno extermination camp.
 German concentration camp for kidnapped Polish children of 2 to 16 years of age established in the city. It was nicknamed "little Auschwitz" due to its conditions.
 1943 - The Germans established a forced labour camp for around 800 English prisoners of war in the Olechów neighbourhood.
 1944
 August: Łódź Ghetto liquidated.
 September: Stalag Luft II POW camp liquidated.
 1945
 German concentration camp for kidnapped Polish children disestablished.
 17 January: City taken by the Soviet Army and afterwards restored to Poland.

1945–2000

 1945
 Łódź University of Technology, University of Łódź and Public Academy of Arts established.
 Dziennik Łodzki newspaper begins publication.

 1946 - Retkinia included within city limits.
 1947 - Animation studio Se-ma-for founded in Łódź.
 1948 - National Film School in Łódź established.
 1950 - Medical Academy of Łódź established.
 1953 - ŁKS Łódź wins its first Polish men's basketball championship.
 1957 - Russkiĭ Golos newspaper begins publication.
 1958
 Łódź Heat Power Stations commissioned.
 ŁKS Łódź wins its first Polish football championship.
 1960 - Central Museum of Textiles established.

 1967
 ŁKS Łódź wins its first Polish women's basketball championship.
 Grand Theatre opens.
 1968
 Ballet festival begins.
 Start Łódź wins its first Polish women's volleyball championship.
 1973 - National choreographic competition begins.
 1974 - Population: 784,000.
 1975
 Stadion ŁKS (stadium) built.
 Museum of the City of Łódź active.
 1978 - Monument of writer Władysław Reymont unveiled.
 1981
 Widzew Łódź wins its first Polish football championship.
 Protest against food shortage.
 1983
 Anilana Łódź wins its first Polish men's handball championship.
 ŁKS Łódź wins its first Polish women's volleyball championship.
 Budowlani Łódź wins its first Polish rugby championship.
 1984 - Monument of Stanisław Staszic unveiled in the Staszic Park in the city center.
 1991 - 2 October: Visit of British Prime Minister Margaret Thatcher.
 1992 - Roman Catholic Diocese of Łódź promoted to archdiocese.
 1998 - Higher School of Art and Design established.
 2000 - Monument of Pope John Paul II unveiled at the Piotrkowska Street.

21st century

 2001 - Twin town partnership signed between Łódź and Örebro, Sweden.
 2002
 Jerzy Kropiwnicki becomes mayor.
 Population: 785,134; province 2,612,900.
 2004 - Łódź Biennale active.
 2006 - Manufaktura shopping mall opens.

 2008
 19 May: Twin town partnership signed between Łódź and Szeged, Hungary.
 September: Open-air Museum of the Łódź Wooden Architecture opened.
 2009
 Arena Łódź opens.
 Łódź co-hosts the EuroBasket 2009.
 2010 - Hanna Zdanowska becomes mayor.
 2011 - Łódź co-hosts the EuroBasket Women 2011.
 2013 - Rail freight transport between Łódź and China started.
 2014 - Łódź co-hosts the 2014 FIVB Volleyball Men's World Championship.
 2015 - Twin town partnership signed between Łódź and Chengdu, China.
 2017
 June: Łódź hosts the 2017 Łódź Sevens tournament of the 2017 Rugby Europe Sevens Grand Prix Series.
 December: Łódź co-hosts the 2017 FIVB Volleyball Men's Club World Championship.
 2018 - Łódź hosts the first ever Mixed Doubles Łódź curling tournament.
 2019
 May–June: Łódź co-hosts the 2019 FIFA U-20 World Cup.
 November: Honorary Consulate of Armenia opened in Łódź.

See also
 Łódź history
 History of Łódź
 List of mayors of Łódź
 List of years in Poland

References

This article incorporates information from the German Wikipedia and Polish Wikipedia.

Bibliography

in English
 
 
 
 
 
 

 Zysiak, Agata et al. From Cotton and Smoke: Łódź - Industrial City and Discourses of Asynchronous Modernity, 1897-1994 (Krakow: Jagiellonian University Press,  2019). online review

in other languages

External links

 
 Europeana. Items related to Łódź, various dates.
 Map of Łódź, 1967

 
Lodz